Intersex people are born with sex characteristics, such as chromosomes, gonads, hormones, or genitals that, according to the UN Office of the High Commissioner for Human Rights, "do not fit the typical definitions for male or female bodies". Such variations may involve genital ambiguity, and combinations of chromosomal genotype and sexual phenotype other than XY-male and XX-female.

Intersex infants and children may be subject to stigma, discrimination and human rights violations, including in education, employment and medical settings. Human rights violations in medical settings are increasingly recognized as human rights abuses. Other human rights and legal issues include the right to life, access to have standing to file compensation claims, access to information, and legal recognition.



Community statements

Malta declaration, 2013

The Malta declaration is the statement of the Third International Intersex Forum, which took place in Valletta, Malta, in 2013. The declaration was made by 34 people representing 30 organisations from multiple regions of the world.

The declaration affirmed the existence of intersex people and demanded an end to "discrimination against intersex people and to ensure the right of bodily integrity, physical autonomy and self-determination". For the first time, participants made a statement on birth registrations, in addition to other human rights issues.

Darlington Statement (Australia/New Zealand), 2017 

In March 2017, a consensus "Darlington Statement" was published by Australian and Aotearoa/New Zealand intersex community organizations and others. The statement calls for legal reform, including the criminalization of deferrable intersex medical interventions on children, an end to legal classification of sex, and improved access to peer support.

Vienna Statement (Europe), 2017 
A statement was published after a conference in Vienna in March 2017. It called for an end to human rights violations, and recognition of rights to bodily integrity, physical autonomy and self-determination. The statement included calls to action by governments, educational institutions, medical and health care providers, media, and allies.

International and regional reports and statements

Yogyakarta Principles, 2006

The 2006 Yogyakarta Principles on the Application of International Human Rights Law in relation to Sexual Orientation and Gender Identity is a set of principles relating to sexual orientation and gender identity, intended to apply international human rights law standards to address the abuse of the human rights of lesbian, gay, bisexual and transgender (LGBT) people. It briefly mentions intersex, influenced by the Declaration of Montreal which first demanded prohibition of unnecessary post-birth surgery to reinforce gender assignment until a child is old enough to understand and give informed consent. The Yogyakarta Principles detail this in the context of existing UN declarations and conventions under Principle 18, which called on states to:

Report of UN Special Rapporteur on Torture, 2013

On 1 February 2013, Juan E. Méndez, the UN Special Rapporteur on torture and other cruel, inhuman or degrading treatment or punishment, issued a statement condemning non-consensual surgical intervention on intersex people. His report states:

Resolution by the Council of Europe, 2013

In October 2013, the Council of Europe adopted a resolution 1952, 'Children's right to physical integrity'. It calls on member states to

World Health Organization and UN interagency report, 2014

In May 2014, the World Health Organization issued a joint statement on Eliminating forced, coercive and otherwise involuntary sterilization, An interagency statement with the OHCHR, UN Women, UNAIDS, UNDP, UNFPA and UNICEF. The report references the involuntary surgical "sex-normalising or other procedures" on "intersex persons". It questions the medical necessity of such treatments, patients' ability to consent, and a weak evidence base. The report recommends a range of guiding principles for medical treatment, including ensuring patient autonomy in decision-making, ensuring non-discrimination, accountability and access to remedies.

Council of Europe Issue Paper, 2015
In a wide-ranging first detailed analysis on intersex health and human rights issues by an international institution, the Council of Europe published an Issue Paper entitled Human rights and intersex people in May 2015. The document highlighted an historic lack of attention to intersex human rights, stating that current social and biomedical understandings of sex and gender make intersex people "especially vulnerable" to human rights breaches. The report cited previous reports from San Francisco, the Swiss National Advisory Commission on Biomedical Ethics and the Australian Senate. The Commissioner for Human Rights made eight recommendations. For this first time, these recognized a right to not undergo sex assignment treatment.

UN Office of the High Commissioner for Human Rights report, 2015

In 2015, the UN Office of the High Commissioner for Human Rights (OHCHR) described human rights violations against intersex people:

The OHCHR acknowledged Australia and Malta as "the first countries to expressly prohibit discrimination against intersex persons," and Malta as "the first State to prohibit sex-assignment surgery or treatment on intersex minors without their informed consent." It called on UN member states to protect intersex persons from discrimination, and address violence by: 
 "Banning “conversion” therapy, involuntary treatment, forced sterilization and forced genital and anal examinations;"
 "Prohibiting medically unnecessary procedures on intersex children"

WHO report, "Sexual health, human rights and the law", 2015

In June 2015, the World Health Organization published a major report on sexual and reproductive rights and the law. Section 3.4.9, on intersex people, identifies discrimination and stigma within health systems (citations omitted):

The report stated that intersex persons are entitled "to access health services on the same basis as others, free from coercion, discrimination and violence", with the ability offer free and informed consent. The report also called for the education and training of medical and psychological professionals on "physical, biological and sexual diversity and integrity".

Asia Pacific Forum of NHRIs manual, 2016

In 2016, the Asia Pacific Forum of National Human Rights Institutions (AFP) manual on Promoting and Protecting Human Rights in relation to Sexual Orientation, Gender Identity and Sex Characteristics. The document provides an analysis of human rights issues, including the rights to physical integrity, non-discrimination, effective remedies and redress, and recognition before the law. The report states:

UN and regional experts statement, 2016 

For Intersex Awareness Day, October 26, UN experts including the Committee against Torture, the Committee on the Rights of the Child and the Committee on the Rights of Persons with Disabilities, along with the Council of Europe Commissioner for Human Rights, the Inter-American Commission on Human Rights and United Nations Special Rapporteurs called for an urgent end to human rights violations against intersex persons, including in medical settings. The experts also called for the investigation of human rights abuses, access to standing to file compensation claims, and the implementation of anti-discrimination measures.

The United Nations Office of the High Commissioner for Human Rights also launched a website, United Nations for Intersex Awareness.

Committee on Bioethics of the Council of Europe, 2017
In January 2017, the Committee on Bioethics of the Council of Europe published a report on children's rights entitled, "The Rights of Children in Biomedicine: Challenges posed by scientific advances and uncertainties". The report was critical of the lack of evidence for early intersex medical interventions, stating that, on "the scientific question of whether intervention is necessary, only three medical procedures have been identified as meeting that criteria in some infants: (1) administration of endocrine treatment to prevent fatal salt-loss in some infants, (2) early removal of streak gonads in children with gonadal dysgenesis, and (3) surgery in rare cases to allow exstrophic conditions in which organs protrude from the abdominal wall or impair excretion".

National and State reports and statements

San Francisco Human Rights Investigation, 2005

The 2005 Human Rights Investigation into the Medical "Normalization" of Intersex People, by the Human Rights Commission of the City and County of San Francisco is thought "likely to be the first human rights report into the treatment of intersex people, certainly in the English language."

Report of Swiss National Advisory Council on Biomedical Ethics, 2012

In late 2012, the Swiss National Advisory Commission on Biomedical Ethics reported on intersex. The Commission report makes a strong case against medical intervention for "psychosocial" reasons:

The report is notable for making a clear apology for damage done to intersex people in the past, and up until the present. It recommends deferring all "non-trivial" surgeries which have "irreversible consequences". The report also recommended criminal sanction for non-medically necessary genital surgeries.

Senate Committee inquiry, Australia, 2013

In October 2013, the Australian Senate published a report entitled Involuntary or coerced sterilisation of intersex people in Australia. The Senate found that "normalising" surgeries are taking place in Australia, often on infants and young children, with preconceptions that it described as "disturbing": "Normalising appearance goes hand in hand with the stigmatisation of difference".

They commented: "...normalisation surgery is more than physical reconstruction. The surgery is intended to deconstruct an intersex physiology and, in turn, construct an identity that conforms with stereotypical male and female gender categories" and: "Enormous effort has gone into assigning and 'normalising' sex: none has gone into asking whether this is necessary or beneficial. Given the extremely complex and risky medical treatments that are sometimes involved, this appears extremely unfortunate."

The report makes 15 recommendations, including ending cosmetic genital surgeries on infants and children and providing for legal oversight of individual cases.

Organisation Intersex International Australia welcomed the report, saying that,

Reports by human rights NGOs

Amnesty International report on Denmark and Germany, 2017

In 2017, Amnesty International published a report condemning "non-emergency, invasive and irreversible medical treatment with harmful effects" on children born with variations of sex characteristics in Germany and Denmark. It found that surgeries take place with limited psychosocial support, based on gender stereotypes, but without firm evidence. Amnesty International reported that "there are no binding guidelines for the treatment of intersex children".

Human Rights Watch/interACT report on U.S. children, 2017

In July 2017, Human Rights Watch and interACT published a report on medically unnecessary surgeries on intersex children, “I Want to Be Like Nature Made Me”, based on interviews with intersex persons, families and physicians. The report states that:

The report found that intersex medical interventions persist as default advice from doctors to parents, despite some change in some regions of the U.S. and claims of improved surgical techniques, resulting in an uneven situation where care differs and a lack of standards of care, but paradigms for care are still based on socio-cultural factors including expectations of "normality" and evidence in support of surgeries remains lacking. "Nearly every parent" in the study reported pressure for their children to undergo surgery, and many reported misinformation. The report calls for a ban on "surgical procedures that seek to alter the gonads, genitals, or internal sex organs of children with atypical sex characteristics too young to participate in the decision, when those procedures both carry a meaningful risk of harm and can be safely deferred." The report was acknowledged as an important contribution to research by the American Academy of Pediatrics, Associated Press reported on the report and opposition to a ban by CARES Foundation.

See also
 Intersex human rights
 Intersex medical interventions
 Discrimination against intersex people
 Legal recognition of intersex people

Notes

Intersex rights
Intersex in non-fiction